DFT v TFD [2010] EWHC 2335 (QB) is an English privacy case which concerned an attempt by a woman to blackmail an individual by revealing details of a sexual relationship the couple had had unless a substantial bribe was paid. A super-injunction was initially granted in the case but later discontinued.

References

External links
 Judgment in this case

English privacy case law
High Court of Justice cases
2010 in case law
2010 in British law
Blackmail